The formation of a new government led by Tammam Salam followed two weeks of negotiations after the resignation of Najib Mikati's government. Salam's candidacy was backed by the March 14 Alliance, the Progressive Socialist Party, Najib Mikati and the Amal Movement.

The government would be the sixth one designated to oversee elections since Lebanon's independence in 1943 when the 2014 general election takes place. A national unity government was announced on 15 February 2014. Despite his nomination by 124 of 128 MPs, Salam then failed to form a consensus government amidst political demands. Salam finally announced his proposed cabinet that included members from the March 8 and March 14 alliances, as well as independents on 15 February 2014.

Background
The Mikati government fell after Najib Mikati's resignation on 22 March 2013 over his attempt to form a committee to oversee the next general election in opposition to Free Patriotic Movement (FPM), Hezbollah and Amal Movement ministers, as well as an attempt to extend the term of Major General Ashraf Rifi, the head of the Internal Security Forces (ISF), who was scheduled to retire in April, due to a mandatory age limit.

Nomination of Tammam Salam
Tammam Salam's emergence as the consensus candidate followed discussion in Saudi Arabia and also had the backing of March 14, Mikati and Amal. PSP leader Walid Jumblatt also supported him saying: "Salam is the voice of moderation... He’s never said a bad word against the resistance." Former Prime Minister Fouad Siniora also said that he was a "unanimous" choice because of his "national and moral engagement. We wish Mr. Salam good luck in leading the country through the present circumstances." Salam then said: "It’s a great national responsibility...I thank my brothers in the March 14 coalition." On 6 April, he got 124 of the 128 parliamentary votes to become prime minister and was consequently tasked by President Michel Suleiman to form a government.

Salam reacted in saying: "There is a need to bring Lebanon out of its state of division and political fragmentation, as reflected on the security situation, and to ward off the risks brought by the tragic situation in the neighbouring [Syria] and by regional tensions." He also said that he intends to form a national unity government instead of a partisan one saying that "the consensus around my nomination is the biggest proof of the intention of political forces to save the country." Future Movement leader Saad Hariri had said that he was willing to share power with Hezbollah if the cabinet formation deadlock was ended while Hezbollah abandoned a demand that it and its allies be given veto power in the new cabinet.

Government formation
On 15 February 2014, Salam announced a national unity government of 24 ministers, including March 8 and March 14 alliances, and independents. UN Secretary-General Ban Ki-moon and the European Union's High Representative of the Union for Foreign Affairs and Security Policy Catherine Ashton welcomed the formation of the government. While Salam said the government would "strengthen national security and stand against all kinds of terrorism" and face the social issue of about a million Syrian refugees in Lebanon, it would also lead to the 2014 Lebanese presidential election.

Composition

Resignation

On 18 December 2016, the Ministry of Information announced the dissolution of the Cabinet, and the formation of a new Cabinet under Saad Hariri.

References

External links

2016 disestablishments in Lebanon
2014 establishments in Lebanon
Cabinets established in 2014
Cabinets of Lebanon
Cabinets disestablished in 2016